A Fishy Story is a 1989 Hong Kong drama film directed by Anthony Chan and starring Kenny Bee, Maggie Cheung and Anthony Chan.

Synopsis
The film tells the tale of aspiring actress Huang (Maggie Cheung), who's trying to achieve fame and fortune in turbulent 1967 Hong Kong. While political unrest sweeps through the territory, Huang uses her looks and charm to romance various wealthy men in hopes of climbing the social ladder. But times are rough for her, just as they are for her neighbor Kung (Kenny Bee),an unlicensed cab driver and a rich woman's toy boy. They don't get along well and despise each other. However, after they have been through glorious and inglorious moments, they gradually become parts of each other.

Cast
 Kenny Bee - Kung
 Maggie Cheung - Huang
 Anthony Chan - Paul Chen
 Josephine Koo - Mrs. Koo
 Carrie Ng - Actress in Musical
 Margaret Lee - Actress in Drama
 Lam Chung - Movie Director

Reception
A Fishy Story was critically acclaimed and box office hit in Hong Kong. Cheung's performance received positive review from Critics.

Awards and nominations
The movie received 6 nominations including Best Film, Best Director (Anthony Chan) and Best Supporting Actress (Josephine Koo) at 9th Hong Kong Film Awards which was held in 1990 and won for Best Cinematography (Peter Pau) and Best Art Direction (Szeto Wai Yung). Maggie Cheung won her first Best Actress Awards.

See also
 List of Hong Kong films

References

External links
 A Fishy Story at the Hong Kong Movie DataBase

1989 films
Hong Kong action comedy films
1989 action comedy films
Films set in Hong Kong
Films shot in Hong Kong
Films set in China
Films set in Macau
1980s Hong Kong films